McCamish Township is one of seven townships in Johnson County, Kansas, USA.  As of the 2010 census, its population was 878.

History
Richard D. McCamish was an early settler who founded the now extinct town of McCamish in 1857.

Adjacent Townships
Lexington Township North
Gardner Township Northeast

Cemeteries
Edgerton Cemetery is located in McCamish Township.

Emergency Services

Police
Johnson County Sheriff

Fire
Johnson County Rural Fire Department

Medical (EMS)
Lexington Township EMS, Post 35

Transportation

Major highways

Lakes, Streams & Ponds
 Santa Fe Lake
 Martin Creek

Parks
 Martin Creek Park

Notable Locations
 Johnson County Parks & Recreation
 199th Street and Interstate 35: Kansas' First Diverging diamond interchange (2013)
 Southern Edge of Sunflower Army Ammunition Plant
 BNSF Intermodal Facility: Largest in the BNSF Railway System 
 Edgerton, Kansas: Inside of Township
 Gardner, Kansas: Northwestern Edge lies inside Township

School districts
 Gardner School District 231

References

External links

Townships in Johnson County, Kansas
Townships in Kansas
1857 establishments in Kansas Territory